Lejasciems Parish is an administrative territorial entity of Gulbene Municipality, Latvia. The central village in the parish is Lejasciems.

Towns, villages and settlements of Lejasciems Parish 
 Cinci
 Čipati
 Dūre
 Jānūži
 Ķilpani
 Krampani
 Lapati
 Lejasciems
 Mālumuiža
 Salaki
 Salmaņi
 Sinole
 Umari
 Zvārtavi

External links 
 

Parishes of Latvia
Gulbene Municipality